( ) is a fictional character in Nintendo's The Legend of Zelda series. He first appeared as a major character in the 2017 action-adventure game The Legend of Zelda: Breath of the Wild. He reappears as a playable character in the 2020 hack-and-slash video game Hyrule Warriors: Age of Calamity. Sidon is the Prince of the Zora, an amphibious race, and is the younger brother of Mipha, who is one of the four Champions who help Princess Zelda and Link fight against Calamity Ganon. In Breath of the Wild, Sidon helps Link to reach Divine Beast Vah Ruta so that he gain control of its ancient power to defeat Ganon. Since his first appearance, Sidon has received an overwhelmingly positive reception from both fans and critics. Due to his muscular physique, boundless enthusiasm, and gleaming white smile, he has achieved a large fan following and has also been the subject of numerous works of fan art and memes on social media.

Concept and creation
Producer Eiji Aonuma and game director Hidemaro Fujibayashi have commented on the popularity of Sidon and have stated that they enjoy Sidon's enthusiasm. Fujibayashi said that during the development of Sidon's character, "he was kind of overly enthusiastic at first". He went on to explain: "We thought it was a bit too much, but as we adjusted his dialogue and improved it, we also came to love his character. So, where he ended up, it makes a lot of sense that people like him".

Character design
Sidon bears the typical fantastical design traits of the Zora, being a humanoid character with features that resemble a fish. He is primarily red or dark pink in colour, with a tail fin sprouting from the top of his head. Eiji Aonuma has commented on his design: "Actually, the initial colour of Prince Sidon's body was blue, but since he's meant to be Mipha's brother, he obviously wouldn't have looked like a sibling. That's why we gave him a pink-ish colour". Artist Yuko Miyakawa said in development notes that he had been asked to create the character as "a passionate, dignified and powerful character with a stronger physique than other Zora" and based his design on a hammerhead shark. As a member of the Zora race, Sidon is taller than the average Hyrulean, but he is also tall by Zora standards. Due to the slow age rate of the Zora, Sidon is a young man with an age of 135 years. Like the other Zora, Sidon wears little clothing, but his attire does feature several items that reflect his status as prince of the Zora, such as his scarf, epaulettes, bracelets, and belt.

Portrayal
Sidon is voiced in English by James D. Mortellaro in Breath of the Wild and Hyrule Warriors: Age of Calamity. He is voiced by Kosuke Onishi in Japanese.

Characteristics
Sidon is the prince of the amphibious Zora and a strong leader of his people. He is also the best swimmer of his race. His friendly, brave and optimistic personality is reflected in his tendency to strike poses during gameplay. He has also been noted for his muscular physique and his gleaming white smile, which have resulted in many fans treating him like a heart-throb. His affable personality means that he is well liked by the Zora people. Sidon is the son of King Dorephan, the ruler of Zora's Domain, which means that he is the next in line as ruler. He displays a great deal of respect for his older sister, Mipha, which provides an emotional element to his storyline. They share a deep bond, which is expressed in one of The Champion's Ballad cutscenes for Breath of the Wild in which Mipha helps baby Sidon to glide up a waterfall in Zora's Domain and tells him, "I believe in you". He sometimes displays moments of grief during gameplay when the death of his sister is mentioned in Hyrule Warriors: Age of Calamity.

Appearances

The Legend of Zelda: Breath of the Wild
Sidon plays a major role in the gameplay of Breath of the Wild as a supportive character to Link. When Link reaches Zora's Domain in Breath of the Wild, he is greeted by Sidon, who holds Link in high regard. Sidon is a friendly ally to Link in his quest to defeat Waterblight Ganon and gain control of Divine Beast Vah Ruta. He provides words of encouragement to Link in gameplay, such as "I believe in you, Link!" Before Link can enter Divine Beast Vah Ruta, he rides on the back of Sidon to be transported along the surface of the water in Zora's Domain in order to reach the Divine Beast. After Link gains control of Vah Ruta, Sidon expresses his gratitude and admiration for Link. Sidon also appears in a cutscene in The Champion's Ballad, the second DLC pack for Breath of the Wild. The cutscene takes the form of a flashback in the storyline, which depicts Sidon as a baby with his sister Mipha. In the storyline of Breath of the Wild, the player learns that Mipha is one of the four Champions who helps Zelda and Link to fight against Calamity Ganon 100 years earlier, but loses her life during the battle. In the present day, Sidon is depicted bowing his head in mourning at night while standing before her memorial statue in Zora's Domain.

Hyrule Warriors: Age of Calamity
Sidon returns as a playable character in Hyrule Warriors: Age of Calamity. During battle, he wields the Zora spear, a weapon that is also used by his sister, Mipha. He can also wield two Ceremonial Tridents and manipulate water to create a powerful attack on surrounding enemies. During gameplay he moves around by riding on a shark created out of water. He can also propel bombs by hitting them with his trident. The storyline takes place 100 years before the events in Breath of the Wild when Calamity Ganon launches an attack on Hyrule. After Zelda's small Guardian Terrako travels back to the past through a time portal, Zelda must gather allies to help defeat Ganon. The storyline involves a cutscene in which Sidon arrives from the future to heroically defend Mipha against Waterblight Ganon while declaring that she will not be taken from him again. The scene reflects upon the tragedy of Mipha's death in the separate timeline, the strength of their bond and the tragedy of the brother and sister never again being together.

Reception
Since his appearance in Breath of the Wild, reception for Prince Sidon has been overwhelmingly positive. Madeline Carpou for Screen Rant included Sidon in sixth place on a list of the "10 biggest himbos in video games", describing him as "a beefcake with standards, going out of his way to help Link in his journey and making sure to flex all the while". Susanna Polo for Polygon commented that "Sidon's appeal had already been emphatically communicated to me by Twitter, Tumblr and...basically any place that fans of the game post fan art and screenshots of the large, encouraging, friendly Zora prince. I couldn't miss him anywhere I went". Michael McWhertor for Polygon opined that "Sidon is notable for his enthusiasm and swimming ability" but also "famous for his smoldering sex appeal". GameSpot commented that "Prince Sidon is anything but a regal jerk; he's actually the most endearing, high-spirited dork you'll find in Hyrule. Just look at that bicep pose and twinkling smile. It's no wonder the internet has fallen in love with him". Due to Sidon's popularity as a character, he has been the subject of numerous works of fan art, tweets and memes that have centred around his sexual attractiveness. In many fanfictions and fandoms, he enters a relationship with Link, the male protagonist of the series. The ship is often called Sidlink. The reason why it became so popular can be found in the way Sidon interacts with Link in the game, which is friendly and encouraging, especially in conversations. Paste writer Holly Green included Prince Sidon on her "the best new game characters of 2017".

Sidon has also received positive comments about the impact of his character and his performance in gameplay. Polygon ranked Sidon among the 70 best video game characters of the 2010s decade. Michael Christopher for The Gamer opined that in Breath of the Wild Sidon is, "one of the most notable characters in the game". Jessica Filby for Screen Rant included Sidon in sixth place on a list of Breath of the Wild characters based on likability, describing him as "a well-respected and popular character" and noting his "endless optimism and care for Link". Renan Fontes for GameRant remarked on Sidon's appearance in Hyrule Warriors: Age of Calamity: As was the case in Breath of the Wild, Sidon is the standout modern Champion. Not only is he the most fun to play as gameplay wise, his scenes with Mipha are genuinely heartbreaking". Jake Koran for Screen Rant described Sidon as "incredible" in Hyrule Warriors: Age of Calamity, commenting that "Sidon's unique action is one of the most powerful in the game". Daniel Alexander for The Gamer ranked Sidon in first place on a list of "The 10 Best New Characters In Breath Of The Wild" noting "his determination and courage" and "his endless optimism and dedication to saving both Zora's Domain and Hyrule". CJ Andriessen of Destructoid opined that Sidon deserves his own game: "He has arguably the most exciting of the Divine Beast action sequences. I can't remember the last time a character absolutely radiated sunshine with every move he made and every word he said". Sara Heritage for The Gamer ranked Sidon in first place on a list that ranked every side character in The Legend Of Zelda: Breath Of The Wild: "Upon reveal in 2017, his smile was so bright it instantly became a meme leading up to the game's release. Smart, dashing and emotionally available, this mourning prince sums up everything good in the world of Hyrule".

See also
 Characters of The Legend of Zelda

Notes

References

Male characters in video games
The Legend of Zelda characters
Video game characters with water abilities
Fictional characters with slowed ageing
Time travelers
Video game characters introduced in 2017
Video game memes
Internet memes introduced in 2017
Prince characters in video games
Nintendo protagonists
Fictional polearm and spearfighters